Birita Ryan (born 24 November 2002) is a Faroese footballer who plays as a defender for 1. deild kvinnur club Klaksvíkar Ítróttarfelag and the Faroe Islands women's national team.

Club career
Ryan has played for KÍ in the Faroe Islands at the UEFA Women's Champions League.

International career
Ryan capped for the Faroe Islands at senior level during the UEFA Women's Euro 2022 qualifying.

References

2002 births
Living people
Faroese women's footballers
Women's association football defenders
Faroe Islands women's youth international footballers
Faroe Islands women's international footballers
KÍ Klaksvík players